Ravi Kant may refer to:

Ravi Kant (Indian executive) (born 1944), former MD of Tata Motors 
Ravi Kant (professor) (born 1956), professor of surgery and Padma Shri award winner

See also
 Ravikant, a given name